= Three guilder coin (Netherlands) =

The three guilder coin (Dutch: driegulden) was a large silver coin of the Netherlands. It was introduced by the province of Holland in 1680, was followed by the other provinces of the Dutch Republic, and in 1694 was taken into the general coinage ordinance of the States-General as a coin of the Generality. The denomination was struck again in the Kingdom of the Netherlands between 1817 and 1832.

== Dutch Republic ==
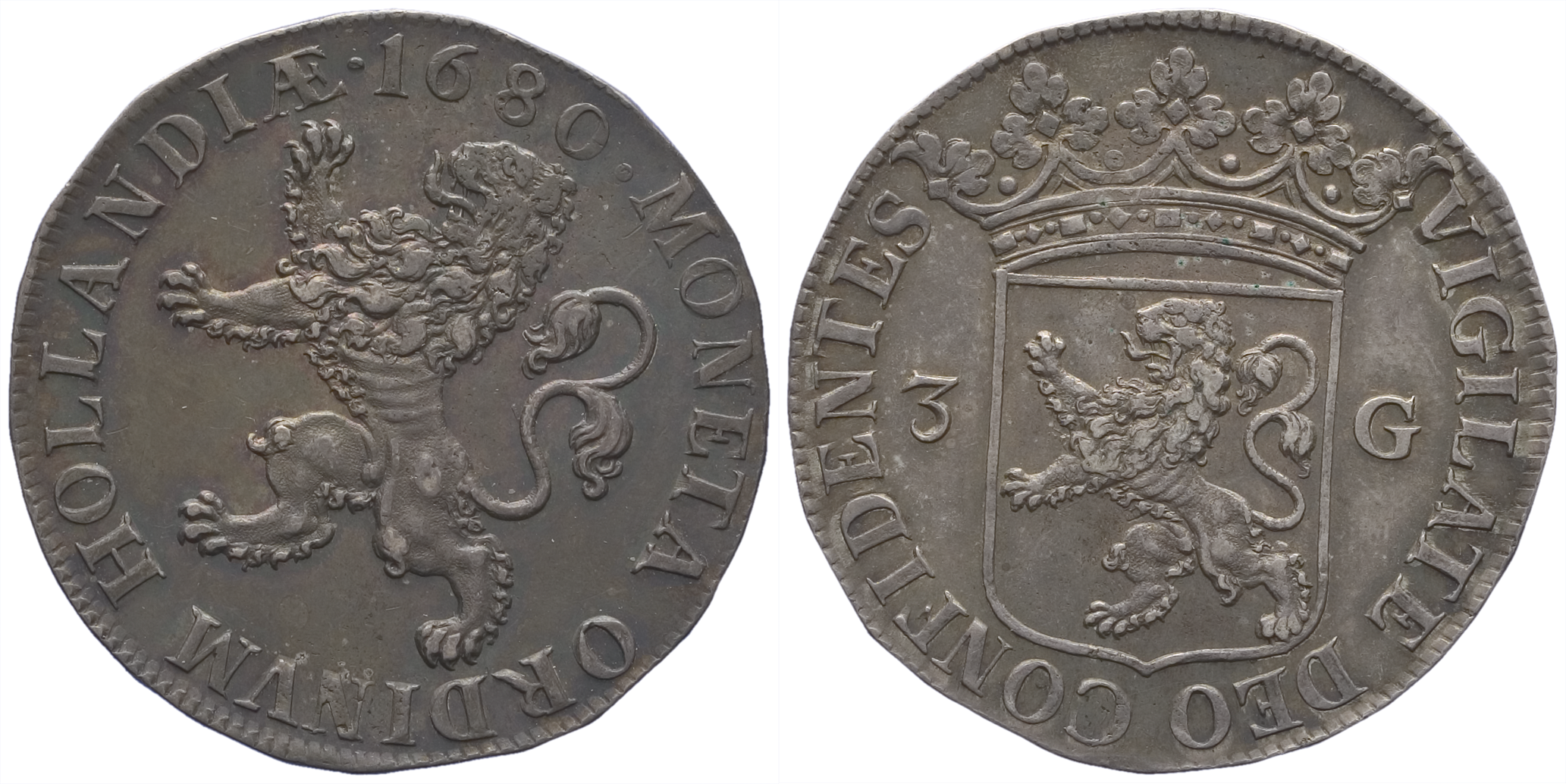
Three guilder piece of the province of Holland, 1680, the first year of the denomination. The obverse carries the Holland lion and the legend MONETA ORDINUM HOLLANDIÆ; the reverse the crowned provincial arms, the value 3 G and the motto VIGILATE DEO CONFIDENTES.

The introduction of coins of three guilders and one guilder was begun by the province of Holland in 1680 and was followed of necessity by the other provinces. A short notification announcing the provincial three- and one-guilder pieces appeared in 1681. The denomination was taken into the general coinage placard issued by the States-General on 17 March 1694, which made the three guilder a coin of the Generality and closed the municipal mints. On 25 May 1694 the States-General had a separate publication printed showing the new coins; it was the first official Dutch coinage publication to be illustrated with a copper engraving rather than a woodcut.

== Kingdom of the Netherlands ==
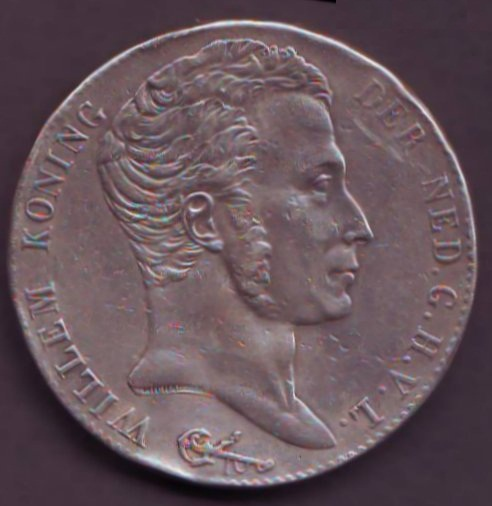
Obverse 3 guilder, 1820.

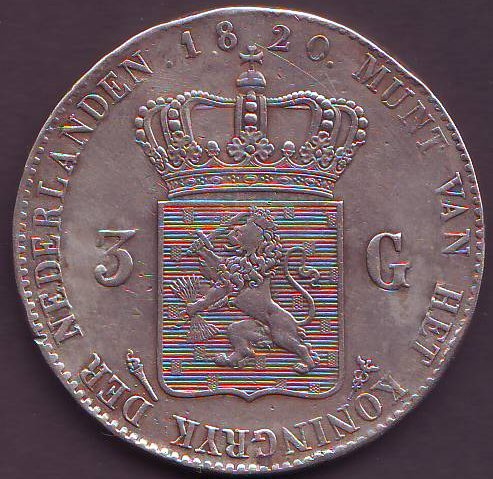
Reverse 3 guilder, 1820.

The obverse featured a portrait of king William I of the Netherlands. On the reverse was a crowned Dutch coat of arms between the value. The coins had a smooth edge with edge lettering ‘GOD ZY MET ONS’. The coins were minted in Utrecht in the years 1817-1824 and 1830-1832. The coins of 1823 were also minted in Brussels.

The coins were minted from silver .893 and had a diameter of 40 mm and a weight of 32.3 gram.
